Acrocercops convoluta is a moth of the family Gracillariidae, known from West Bengal, India, as well as Sri Lanka and Vietnam. It was described by Edward Meyrick in 1908.

References

convoluta
Moths of Asia
Moths described in 1908